Basem Naim (born 1963) is a Palestinian physician and politician and a member of Hamas. Naim served as Minister of Youth and Sports in the Palestinian National Unity Government of March 2007. After the Battle of Gaza and the dissolution of the unity government on June 14, 2007, by Palestinian President Mahmoud Abbas, Naim became Health Minister of the Gaza Strip. He stepped down in 2012 and became the head of the Council on International Relations in Gaza.

Naim holds a degree in medicine from Germany and a PhD in surgery. He has worked at the al-Shifa Hospital in Gaza City. His eldest son was a member of the Izz ad-Din al-Qassam Brigades and was killed at the age of 17 during an Israeli incursion in Shuja'iyya.

Naim has a large following on social media where he often posts anti-Israel and pro-BDS messages. Naim has several times condemned terror attacks against Jews.

References

External links 
 Council on International Relations - Palestine
 America's empty words will not guarantee a solution in Palestine, March 21, 2018. Basem Naim. Middle East Eye.
 How NYT got it wrong about Razzan al-Najjar and the Great March of Return, January 17, 2019. Basem Naim. Middle East Eye.
 Gaza and Hamas: How Jason Greenblatt aims to turn the victim into executioner, May 7, 2019. Basem Naim. Middle East Eye.

Hamas members
Living people
Health Ministers of Palestine
Palestinian physicians
Government ministers of the Gaza Strip
1963 births
21st-century Palestinian politicians